Khasf al-Bayda (Arabic: خسف البیداء) (lit. Swallowing in the land of Bayda), in Islamic eschatology, is an upcoming event in which the Earth will swallow the land Bayda which is a desert between Mecca and Medina. According to Islamic traditions: the army of Sufyani will be collapsed in the land of Bayda.

Khasf al-Bayda event has been mentioned in both Shia and Sunni sources, and it was narrated that "Khasf al-Bayda" is going to be happened among the decisive Signs of the appearance of Mahdi.

The certain signs
According to hadiths, there are five (or more) certain signs which will happen prior to the reappearance of the twelfth (last) Imam of Shia Islam, al-Mahdi. Al-Shaykh al-Saduq has narrated --from Ja'far al-Sadiq-- that: five signs are decisive before the rising of Ghaem (قائم): Yamani, Sufyani, Heavenly cry (calling) from the sky, The murder of Nafs-e-Zakiyyah and Khasf-e-Bayda

Swallowing of the army 
Sufyani and his army will go towards Iraq to attack Mahdi. When the army will enter the territory of Bayda, the Earth will sunk the army of Sufyani except 2 or 3 individuals. In regards to the event of Khasf-al-Bayda, there have been narrated diverse Hadiths concerning the numbers of the presented ones in the army of Sufyani. Some sources say that the army of Sufyani will be 12,000; while some say 170,000 and some sources say 300,000 will be the number of Sufyani's army.

According a tradition from, Muhammad al-Baqir: at the End Time, while Sufyani's army enters the territory of (al-) Bayda, a caller will call:

See also 
 Occultation (Islam)
 Seyyed Hassani
 Seyed Khorasani
 Al-Yamani (Shiism)
 The voice from sky
 The Fourteen Infallibles
 Nafs-e-Zakiyyah (Pure soul)
 Signs of the reappearance of al-Mahdi

References 

Shia imams
Shia Islam
Islamic eschatology
Shia eschatology
Islamic terminology
Mahdism